My Dear Girl (foaled February 17, 1957 in Florida) was an American Champion Thoroughbred racehorse.

Background
My Dear Girl was bred by Ocala Stud Farm, owned by a nine-person syndicate headed by Bruce Campbell that was in just its second year of operation. She was purchased by Floridian Frances A. Genter, who would own and race a number of top horses including Unbridled, who won the 1990 Kentucky Derby.

Racing career
My Dear Girl made her racing debut on February 19, 1959 at Florida's Hialeah Park Race Track. She was initially trained by Melvin "Sunshine" Calvert's assistant George Seabo but after the filly won the 1959 Florida Breeders' Stakes at Hialeah, Calvert decided to take charge. She went on to win the important Frizette Stakes at Belmont Park and at Garden State Park the Gardenia Stakes which she won by five lengths on a muddy track that would prove to be the clincher for national honors. After finishing 1959 with five wins from seven starts, all under jockey Manuel Gonzales, My Dear Girl was voted American Champion Two-Year-Old Filly.

Breeding record
A successful broodmare for her owner Frances Genter, My Dear Girl's best foal to race was In Reality.

Honors
Inaugurated at Calder Race Course in 1982, the My Dear Girl Stakes was part of Calder's Florida Stallion Stakes series through 2013. After Calder's racing operations were leased to the Stronach Group it was moved to their Gulfstream Park operation when it became part of the Florida Thoroughbred Breeders' & Owners' Association (FTBOA) Florida Sire series .

References

1957 racehorse births
Racehorses bred in Florida
Racehorses trained in the United States
American Champion racehorses
Thoroughbred family 21-a